The Spanish Peaks are a pair of prominent mountains located in southwestern Huerfano County, Colorado.  The Comanche people call them Huajatolla or Wa-to-yah meaning "double mountain". 

The two peaks, East Spanish Peak at elevation  and West Spanish Peak at elevation , are east of, and separate from, the Culebra Range of the Sangre de Cristo Mountains. Both of the Spanish Peaks are higher than any point in the United States farther east. The Spanish Peaks are situated  due south of Colorado Springs.

The Spanish Peaks were formed by two separate shallow (or hypabyssal) igneous intrusions during the Late-Oligocene epoch of the Paleogene Period.  West Spanish Peak is an older (24.59 +/- 0.13 Ma) quartz syenite. East Spanish Peak (23.36 +/- 0.18 Ma) is composed of a granodiorite porphyry surrounded by a more aerially-extensive exposure of granite porphyry.  The granite porphyry represents the evolved upper portion of the magma chamber while the interior granodiorite porphyry is exposed by erosion at the summit.

The Spanish Peaks were designated a National Natural Landmark in 1976 as two of the best known examples of igneous dikes.

They were an important landmark on the Santa Fe Trail, the first sighting of the Rocky Mountains for travelers on the trail. The mountains can be seen as far north as Colorado Springs, points south to Raton, New Mexico, and points on the Great Plains east of Trinidad (up to ). A classic book about travel to the region in the 1840s is Wah-to-yah and the Taos Trail, by Lewis Garrard.

The Spanish Peaks Wilderness area of  encompasses the summits of both Spanish peaks.  Hiking is popular in the wilderness area.

See also
Breast shaped hills

References

External links

National Park Service

Mountains of Colorado
Sangre de Cristo Mountains
Mountains of Huerfano County, Colorado
Mountains of Las Animas County, Colorado
National Natural Landmarks in Colorado
Stocks (geology)